Bend Studio (formerly Blank, Berlyn & Co., Inc. and Eidetic, Inc.) is an American video game developer based in Bend, Oregon. Founded in 1992, the studio is best known for developing Bubsy 3D, the Syphon Filter series, and Days Gone. Since 2000, Bend Studio is a first-party developer for PlayStation Studios.

History 

Marc Blank and Michael Berlyn founded Bend Studio as Blank, Berlyn & Co. in 1992. Blank had been a founder and the product development director for Infocom, while Berlyn, an author of adventure games, had previously worked at Infocom before moving to Accolade. Blank was approached by a California company after an employee had used Cornerstone, a software package by Infocom, and remembered that the company also developed games. That company was looking to release a "sound-oriented game machine for cars", for which Blank suggested a series of sports games that would sound like radio broadcasts. The project never went into production and Blank repurposed the idea for an American football video game with an ambiance resembling a TV broadcast. In 1992, he pitched the idea to Berlyn, wondering whether Accolade would be interested in such a title.

A few months after the 1993 release of Bubsy in Claws Encounters of the Furred Kind, when Berlyn was on hiatus at Accolade, they began developing games under the Blank, Berlyn & Co. name. Blank became the president of the new company. The company's first games were the puzzle video games Columbo's Mystery Capers and Dell Crossword Puzzles for the Apple Newton. Both were released in November 1993 by StarCore, Apple's publishing label for the Newton. Two further such games, Dell Crossword Puzzles and Other Word Games and Motile, followed by June 1994. According to Arnie Katz of Electronic Games, these releases proved Blank, Berlyn & Co. "tremendously successful". Thereafter, Russ Wetmore, the developer of Preppie! II, joined the developer after a seven-year tenure at Apple. They realized Blank's football game idea as Live Action Football using ScriptX, which allowed for a simultaneous release on Microsoft Windows and Macintosh System Software. Accolade published the game in November 1994 as the first in a series of sports games that Blank, Berlyn & Co. was to develop for the publisher. The next of these was to be a baseball game.

Following these releases, Blank, Berlyn & Co. looked to expand further, changing its name to Eidetic in April 1995 and recruiting technical director Christopher Reese. Under the new name, Eidetic developed Bubsy 3D with a team of approximately eight people. It was the studio's first console game and first 3D game; Reese described the transition to 3D as "difficult". Released in 1996 for the PlayStation, Bubsy 3D was unsuccessful, which Reese attributed to its competition with Crash Bandicoot. Thereafter, 989 Studios. a division of Sony Computer Entertainment (SCE), approached Eidetic with a one-page pitch for Syphon Filter, an action and stealth game. According to creative director John Garvin, who was hired during the game's development, SCE had had faith in Eidetic because it had experience in PlayStation development and already had an engine that the game could be built on. The development of Syphon Filter was difficult because Eidetic had no experience making a stealth-action game. The company expanded to thirteen people, while Berlyn left the company due to his dissatisfaction with the state of the video game industry and the nature of Syphon Filter. Due to missing deadlines and making changes to the game's structure, story and mechanics, Syphon Filter was almost canceled several times. Despite the difficulties, 989 Studios producer Connie Booth had great faith in the project. Syphon Filter was released in 1999 and sold over one million units.

Eidetic continued developing Syphon Filter games for SCE, creating six further until 2007, uninterrupted by any other release. SCE acquired the studio in 2000, renaming it Bend Studio. Beyond the Syphon Filter series, Bend Studio wanted to develop games for a different franchise and decided to develop a Resistance game for the PlayStation Portable due to similarities between Resistance and Syphon Filter. Bend Studio create a demo for the game and showed it to SCE producers and the original Resistance developer, Insomniac Games, and was approved to begin development of Resistance: Retribution. After the game's 2009 release, Bend Studio dedicated nine employees to Uncharted: Golden Abyss for the PlayStation Vita. After several ideas for the project were rejected by franchise developer Naughty Dog, the developer ultimately agreed to Bend Studio's vision and had the project approved. Bend Studio worked closely with Naughty Dog and was allowed to use all assets from Uncharted: Drake's Fortune and Uncharted 2: Among Thieves. Bend Studio also worked on Uncharted: Fight for Fortune in conjunction with One Loop Games.

Bend Studio's first original intellectual property (IP) after Syphon Filter was Days Gone, released in April 2019 for the PlayStation 4. Garvin and the game's director, Jeff Ross, left the studio by December 2020. However, Garvin claims the company fired him for having "a disruptive personality". Bend Studio has distanced itself from Garvin after his rant on Twitter where he blamed "woke" gamers for the middling critical reception of Days Gone. As of June 2021, the studio is working on a new IP that builds on the open-world systems from Days Gone. On June 7, 2022, Bend Studio unveiled their new logo.

Games

References

External links 
 

1992 establishments in Oregon
2000 mergers and acquisitions
American companies established in 1992
Companies based in Bend, Oregon
First-party video game developers
PlayStation Studios
Video game companies established in 1992
Video game companies of the United States
Video game development companies